The Carter Sisters, (also known as the second version of The Carter Family) were an American singing quartet consisting of Maybelle Carter and her daughters June Carter Cash, Helen Carter, and Anita Carter.  Formed during World War II, the group recorded and performed into the 1990s.

History

In the 1920s through the early 1940s, Maybelle Carter was part of the historic country music trio The Carter Family with her cousin Sara Carter and Sara's husband A. P. Carter. Maybelle's contribution to the group was singing harmony to Sara's lead vocal as well as playing guitar.  Maybelle was married to A.P.'s brother Ezra Carter and had three daughters: June, Helen, and Anita.

In March 1943, when the original Carter Family trio stopped recording together after their WBT-AM contract ended, Maybelle Carter formed "Mother Maybelle and The Carter Sisters" with her three daughters, who had frequently appeared with The Carter Family on their radio broadcasts of the late 1930s. When this new act began, June was 14, Helen was 16, and Anita was 10.

The group was said to have been a mix of traditional songs of the original Carter Family with pop, gospel, and vaudeville comedy. Each daughter made her own contribution to the band. 
 Helen: vocals, guitar, and accordion
 Anita: vocals, guitar, and bass fiddle
 June: vocals, autoharp, guitar, banjo, dance, and comedy (she could carry a tune but struggled with pitch problems and soon began to focus more on her comedic addition to the group.)

The group (originally from Poor Valley, Virginia) made their first move to Richmond, Virginia in 1943. (They were reported as having kept their travel low key, with their father Ezra driving the group in a van to and from their destinations.) The new group first aired on radio station WRNL in Richmond on June 1, 1943. This broadcast would serve as their first commercially sponsored program and their first radio debut as "The Carter Sisters and Mother Maybelle." The girls' next big break was offered to them by "Sunshine Sue" of WRVA-AM. In September 1946 the group was asked to be a part of The Old Dominion Barn Dance on WRVA. The show had just begun and started small; however, by the end of its first year, it was selling out its 1,400-seat theater twice a night, every Saturday. The group soon became a headliner for the show. Having spent five years in Richmond, the girls were yet again offered a job opportunity, this time in Knoxville, Tennessee.

In 1948, towards the end of their time in Richmond, the girls were offered the chance to work for WNOX-AM in Knoxville. They accepted and were then played on both the evening show, Tennessee Barn Dance; and the daily show, Mid-Day Merry-Go-Round. In Knoxville, they met and began working with guitarist, Chet Atkins.

Now known as The Carter Sisters and Mother Maybelle with Chet Atkins, the group released its first record on February 2, 1949, produced in Atlanta, Georgia through RCA Victor records. The group recorded many singles in the 1950s. The sisters also individually released occasional single records but none of their recordings in this era were particularly successful, despite their fame and popularity as a concert act.

Offered a radio show at Springfield, Missouri's KWTO, the group, along with Atkins left Knoxville. They worked as a popular addition at KWTO in 1949 and 1950.

In June 1950 the group was offered a job at the Grand Ole Opry in Nashville, Tennessee. They accepted and their performances became some of their most famous and valued work. They performed with famous names such as Elvis Presley, Carl Smith (June's husband at the time), Ernest Tubb, and Johnny Cash and spent roughly ten years working the Grand Ole Opry as well as on various other radio broadcasts. They became members of the Opry in the early 1950s.  June also began making frequent solo performances in concert and on television during this era.

After A.P. Carter's death in 1960, Maybelle officially renamed the girls' group  "The Carter Family" after the original act. In 1963 The Carter Family began working as part of the Johnny Cash road show. During this period, all four members of the group occasionally recorded as solo artists. June and Helen released a number of singles; Anita had several chart records and hit duets with both Hank Snow on "Bluebird Island" and with Waylon Jennings on "I Got You". She and Snow released an album of duets on RCA Records. June would later have a solo hit in 1971 with "A Good Man." She and Cash eventually began a relationship (initially extramarital); both divorced their spouses in 1966 and married in 1968) and went on to record several hits with him. Maybelle Carter recorded a number of solo albums, mostly instrumental performances, and in 1967 reunited with Sara Carter for an album of old-timey music titled "Historic Reunion."

The act continued and actually enjoyed its greatest success in the early 1970s. June's marriage to Cash brought the Carter Sisters regular appearances on television's The Johnny Cash Show and the first major chart hit records of their career. In 1973, the act won "Favorite Country Vocal Group" on the American Music Awards, a surprise victory over the more commercially successful The Statler Brothers (another group closely associated with Cash) and The Osborne Brothers. Each of the sisters released LPs on various record labels as well as recording several albums of music as a group.

The second edition of The Carter Family released their last record, the 1977 single "Papa's Sugar" a year before Mother Maybelle's death. Helen and Anita continued to appear as part of The Johnny Cash show.  In the mid and late 1980s, Anita, Helen, and their children briefly recorded as The Carter Family for Audiograph Records and later Mercury Records.  June did not participate in these recordings although she remained close to her sisters. In the 1990s Anita's health issues limited her appearances with her sisters and she occasionally was replaced on some concert appearances by June's daughter Rosey.

In 1989 The Carter Sisters joined The Nitty Gritty Dirt Band for the recording of their Country Music Association's Album of the Year, the followup Will the Circle Be Unbroken, Vol. 2. In 1990, the album was celebrated on the PBS music television program Austin City Limits, which featured a performance by The Carter Sisters of "Keep on the Sunny Side" and with the full ensemble on the Carter Family song, "Will The Circle Be Unbroken", from the original 1972 album.

Discography

Albums

The Carter Family receives special billing on the cover for their background vocals on Merle Haggard's 1971 album The Land of Many Churches.

Selected Singles

Guest singles

	
Johnny Cash With Carter Family, The - The Three Bells (7", Promo)	Columbia	38-04740	1984

Further reading
 Wolfe, Charles K. "Mother Maybelle and the Carter Sisters." Classic Country: Legends of Country Music. New York: London Routledge, 2001. 12-18. NetLibrary. Web. 10 Nov. 2010.
 Seemann, Charlie. "Review (untitled)." The Journal of American Folklore 111.442 (1998): 450-51. JSTOR. Web. 8 Nov. 2010.
 Anshaw, Carol, Sharon O'Brien, Gayle Pemberton, Emma Perez, Carole Maso, Ann E. Matter, Michele Wallace, Kate Daniels, Kathryn Stripling Byer, and Cynthia Hogue. "Listeners' Delight: Ten Writers Choose Their "Desert Island Disks" The Women's Review of Books 18.3 (2000): 10-12. JSTOR. Web. 8 Nov. 2010.
 Kahn, Ed. "The Carter Family on Border Radio." American Music 14.2 (1996): 205-17. JSTOR. Web. 8 Nov. 2010.
 Ratliff, Ben. "June Carter Cash, a Fixture In Country Music, Dies at 73." The New York Times 16 May 2003, A25 sec. ProQuest Historical Newspapers. Web. 10 Nov. 2010.
 Strauss, Neil. "Anita Carter, Country Singer, Is Dead at 66." The New York Times 2 Aug. 1999, A13 sec. ProQuest Historical Newspapers. Web. 10 Nov. 2010.

References

Vocal quartets
American vocal groups
Musical groups established in 1943
Musical groups disestablished in the 1990s
Grand Ole Opry members
Cash–Carter family
Carter Family songs
1943 establishments in Virginia
1990s disestablishments in Virginia